Thomas Thynne, 1st Marquess of Bath, KG, PC (13 September 173419 November 1796), of Longleat in Wiltshire, was a British politician who held office under King George III. He served as Southern Secretary, Northern Secretary and Lord Lieutenant of Ireland. Between 1751 and 1789, he was known as the 3rd Viscount Weymouth. He is possibly best known for his role in the Falklands Crisis of 1770.

Early life
He was born on 13 September 1734, the eldest son and heir of Thomas Thynne, 2nd Viscount Weymouth (1710–1751) by his wife Louisa Carteret (c. 1712–1736), a daughter of John Carteret, 2nd Earl Granville, 2nd Baron Carteret (1690–1763). On her father's side, she was a great-granddaughter of John Granville, 1st Earl of Bath (1628–1701), and her father's first-cousin was William Granville, 3rd Earl of Bath (1692–1711), on whose death the Earldom of Bath became extinct.

Family origins
The Thynnes are descended from Sir John Thynne (c. 1515–1580), the builder of Longleat House, the family seat in Wiltshire, who acquired vast estates after the Dissolution of the Monasteries. Sir John owed his wealth and position to the favour of his master, the Lord Protector Edward Seymour, 1st Duke of Somerset. He was comptroller of the household of the future Queen Elizabeth I of England. Another famous ancestor was Thomas Thynne (1648–1682), called on account of his wealth "Tom of Ten Thousand" and celebrated by Dryden as Issachar in Absalom and Achitophel, who was murdered in London in February 1682.

Career
He succeeded his father as 3rd Viscount Weymouth in January 1751 and served as Lord Lieutenant of Ireland for a short time during 1765, although he never visited that country. Having become prominent in British politics, he was appointed Secretary of State for the Northern Department in January 1768 and acted with great promptitude during the unrest caused by John Wilkes and the Middlesex election of 1768. He was then attacked and libeled by Wilkes, who was consequently expelled from the House of Commons.

Falklands Crisis
Before the close of 1768, he was transferred from the Northern Department to become Secretary of State for the Southern Department, but he resigned in December 1770 in the midst of the "Falklands Crisis", a dispute with Spain over the possession of the Falkland Islands.

American War of Independence
In November 1775, Weymouth returned to his former office of Secretary of State for the Southern Department, undertaking in addition the duties attached to the northern department for a few months in 1779, but he resigned both positions in the autumn of that year. This period covered the American War of Independence.

Later life
He was High Steward of the Royal Town of Sutton Coldfield from 1781 until his death in November 1796, having been created Marquess of Bath in 1789. The title of Earl of Bath that had been held by his Granville ancestor was then unavailable, as it had been recreated for a member of the Pulteney family.

Marriage and issue
In 1759, he married Lady Elizabeth Bentinck, daughter of William Bentinck, 2nd Duke of Portland and the art collector Margaret Bentinck, Duchess of Portland, with whom he had three sons and four daughters, including:
 Lady Henrietta Thynne (born 16 November 1762)
Lady Sophia Thynne (born 18 December 1763)
Thomas Thynne, 2nd Marquess of Bath (25 January 1765 – 27 March 1837), eldest son and heir.
 Lady Maria Thynne (born 1 August 1767, died March 1768)
Lady Isabella Thynne (born 1 October 1768)
George Thynne, 2nd Baron Carteret (23 January 1770 – 19 February 1838), who inherited the title Baron Carteret by special remainder from his paternal uncle Henry Carteret, 1st Baron Carteret (1735–1826) (born Henry Thynne), of Haynes Park in Bedfordshire and of Stowe House, Kilkhampton in Cornwall, the seat of his ancestor John Granville, 1st Earl of Bath (1628–1701), which descended via the Carteret family.

Legacy
Weymouth Street in Marylebone is named after him. His wife's family once owned the land on which the street was later built.

References

Attribution:

Thomas

1734 births
1796 deaths
Alumni of St John's College, Cambridge
British Secretaries of State
Grooms of the Stool
Knights of the Garter
Lords Lieutenant of Ireland
1
Members of the Privy Council of Great Britain
Leaders of the House of Lords
Court of George III of the United Kingdom